Marina Hyde (born Marina Elizabeth Catherine Dudley-Williams; 13 May 1974) is an English journalist. She joined The Guardian newspaper in 2000 and, as one of the newspaper's columnists, writes three articles each week on current affairs, celebrity, and sport.

Early life and education
Hyde is the daughter of Sir Alastair Edgcumbe James Dudley-Williams, 2nd Baronet, and his wife, the former Diana Elizabeth Jane Duncan. Through her father, she is the granddaughter of aviation pioneer and Conservative politician Sir Rolf Dudley-Williams, 1st Baronet. She attended Downe House School, near Newbury in Berkshire, and read English at Christ Church, Oxford.

The Sun
Hyde began her career in journalism as a temporary secretary on the Showbiz desk at The Sun newspaper. In an otherwise unrelated article in The Guardian, she wrote: "I am only called Marina Hyde because my real name was too long to fit across a single column in The Sun, where I started out". She was later sacked by Sun editor David Yelland after it emerged she had been exchanging e-mails with Piers Morgan, editor of rival newspaper the Daily Mirror.

The Guardian
Since 2000, Hyde has worked for The Guardian, at first writing the newspaper's Diary column. She contributes three columns a week: one on sport, one on celebrity, and one which is typically about politics. Her sport column appears on Thursday; her celebrity column is entitled Lost in Showbiz and appears in the G2 supplement each Friday. She has a regular serious column in the main section of The Guardian on Saturday, as well as a column in the "Weekend" supplement, in which she parodies a celebrity diary entry. This is entitled A Peek at the Diary of..., which ends in the sign-off, "As seen by Marina Hyde". Hyde was nominated as Columnist of the Year in the 2010 British Press Awards.

Elton John unsuccessfully sued The Guardian for libel in relation to Hyde's spoof diary column "A peek at the diary of... 'Sir Elton John'", published in July 2008. Mr Justice Tugendhat ruled that the "irony" and "teasing" did not amount to defamation. Hyde published a follow-up diary of Elton John in 2009.

In November 2011, The Guardian apologised to The Sun newspaper for an article in which Hyde had falsely alleged the newspaper had visited the home of a member of the legal team of the Leveson Inquiry. In the front-page story Hyde had accused The Sun of "blowing a giant raspberry at Lord Justice Leveson’s inquiry". The Suns then managing editor Richard Caseby sent a toilet roll accompanied by "a squalid note" to Guardian editor Alan Rusbridger after Hyde's false story.

A few months later, Caseby once again objected to an article by Hyde in which, according to Roy Greenslade, she was "employing irony", in a reference to Page 3 models following a comment on Twitter by Rupert Murdoch and the use by The Sun of a photograph of model Reeva Steenkamp in a bikini, on the day after her murder. Caseby objected to the article, and complained to The Guardians readers' editor, but his complaint was the only one received.

Hyde received two awards from the Sports Journalists' Association (SJA) in February 2020, including Sports Journalist of the Year, the first woman to receive the award in its 43-year history. The other award was for Sports Columnist of the Year. She had written columns during the year on Prime Minister Theresa May’s decision to award a knighthood to Geoff Boycott, Tiger Woods’s performance at the 2019 Masters, and male responses to the FIFA Women's World Cup that year.

Hyde has won awards for her journalism. In 2017 she was named Political Commentator of the Year at the Editorial Intelligence Comment Awards, as well as winning the Commentariat of the Year Award. At the 2018 Editorial Intelligence Comment Awards, she received the Commentator of the Year award. In 2019, she won Political Commentator of the Year at the National Press Awards. Also in 2019, she received the Columnist of the Year award at the British Journalism Awards. She won the same award again at the British Journalism Awards in 2020. Also in 2020, she became the first woman ever to win the Sports Journalist of the Year award at the British Sports Journalism Awards. At the same event, she also won Sports Columnist of the Year. In 2020 Hyde won the London Press Club's Edgar Wallace Award for writing or reporting of the highest quality.

Other work
Hyde's book about celebrity, Celebrity: How Entertainers Took Over the World and Why We Need an Exit Strategy, was published in 2009. What Just Happened?!, a collection of her Guardian columns written between 2016 and 2022, was published in 2022.

She appeared occasionally on the BBC's Newsnight Review.

Personal life
In 1999, Hyde married Kieran Clifton, a director at the BBC. The couple had a child in 2010 and live in London. Their third child was born in the summer of 2014.

References

External links

Marina Hyde profile at The Guardian, including an archive of columns
Marina Hyde, whocomments.org

1974 births
Living people
English columnists
English non-fiction writers
Writers from London
The Guardian journalists
Place of birth missing (living people)
The Sun (United Kingdom) people
Daughters of baronets
Alumni of Christ Church, Oxford
People educated at Downe House School